Susan Owens (born c. 1949) is an American lawyer, jurist, and a current Associate Justice of the Washington Supreme Court. On November 7, 2000, she was elected the seventh woman to serve on the court. She joined the court after serving nineteen years as District Court Judge in Western Clallam County, where she was the county's senior elected official with five terms. She also served as the Quileute Tribe's Chief Judge for five years and Chief Judge of the Lower Elwha Klallam Tribe for more than six years.

Owens was born and raised in Kinston, North Carolina, where she graduated from high school. Her father, Frank Owens, was a small town general practitioner, and her mother, Hazel is a retired law enforcement officer. She attended college at Duke University. After graduation in 1971, she attended law school at the University of North Carolina at Chapel Hill, receiving her Juris Doctor in 1975. She was admitted to the Oregon State Bar in 1975, and the Washington State Bar in 1976.

Notable opinions
Justice Owens signed the majority opinions sanctioning the delegations of very broad policy-setting powers to appointive-board governments.

In September 2017, Justice Owens wrote for the majority when, by a vote of 5-3, it upheld the child pornography trafficking conviction of a seventeen-year-old boy for sexting a picture of himself to an adult woman.

In October 2018, Owens concurred when the majority abolished the state's death penalty because they found its racist imposition violated the Constitution of Washington.

References

External links
 "Justice Susan Owens", Washington Courts. Retrieved Jan 21, 2010.

1949 births
Living people
Duke University alumni
People from Kinston, North Carolina
Justices of the Washington Supreme Court
University of North Carolina School of Law alumni
21st-century American judges
21st-century American women judges